Glenalta railway station is located on the Belair line. Situated in the Adelaide southern foothills suburb of Glenalta, it is 19.3 kilometres from Adelaide station.

History

Genalta station opened as Belair Road.

In 1995, the eastern side platform was closed when the inbound line was converted to standard gauge as part of the One Nation Adelaide-Melbourne line gauge conversion project. During the late 1990s/early 2000s, the original down shelter was replaced with the current shelter.

Services by platform

Transport links

|}

References

External links

Railway stations in Adelaide